Good Natured is a book by primatologist Frans de Waal on animal behavior and the evolution of ethics.

Publishing history

The book was published in 1996 by Harvard University Press under the full title Good Natured: The Origins of Right and Wrong in Humans and Other Animals. Much of the book details observations of primate behavior, especially that of chimpanzees and bonobos. On the final page, he concludes:

Notes

References

External links
 Good Natured at the Harvard University Press
 Review by Elena Madison 
 Review by William C. McGrew

Biology books
Primatology
Ethology
Harvard University Press books